Paseka is a municipality and village in Olomouc District in the Olomouc Region of the Czech Republic. It has about 1,300 inhabitants.

Administrative parts
Hamlets of Karlov and Pasecký Žleb are administrative parts of Paseka.

Geography
The  western part of the municipality is located in the Upper Morava Valley, the eastern part is located in the Nízký Jeseník mountain range.

History
The first written mention of Paseka is from 1326. It was originally named Těchanov after its founder Těchan and renamed later in the 14th century. The hamlet of Karlov is first mentioned in 1417.

Economy
A specialized medical institute was founded here in 1915.

Sport
In Karlov there is a small ski resort.

Sights

The parish Church of Saint Cunigunde is the historic landmark of the municipality. It was first mentioned in 1351 and rebuilt in 1603, when the late Renaissance tower was added, and in the Baroque style in 1784. In front of the church is a Baroque statue of Saint John of Nepomuk from 1735.

An arboretum was founded here in 2008. It is open to public from spring till autumn. A part of the specialized medical institute is a large freely accessible ornamental park.

References

External links

Villages in Olomouc District